Donkeyboy (occasionally stylised as donkeyboy) is a synthpop band from Drammen, Norway, formed in 2005. The band consists of Cato Sundberg (vocals, rhythm guitar), Kent Sundberg (synth, vocals), Peter Michelsen (guitar, backing vocals) and Thomas Drabløs (drums)

History 

Donkeyboy were signed to Warner Music after an employee came across their music on MySpace. Their debut single, "Ambitions" was released on 26 March 2009 and was put into heavy rotation by NRK P3. The song's chorus is built around a bassline similar to those used on Michael Jackson's "Billie Jean" and some of Madonna's 1980s songs.  The song features guest vocals by Linnea Dale. "Ambitions" debuted on the Norwegian singles chart at number seven on 6 April 2009, and reached the number one spot on 29 June, after 13 weeks on the charts. "Ambitions" remained at the number one spot for 12 consecutive weeks, before being replaced by the band's second single "Sometimes" on September 22. This was the first time ever for a Norwegian artist to occupy the top two spots on the singles chart. Guitarist Peter Michelsen described the situation as "completely absurd".

Donkeyboy's debut album Caught in a Life was released on 19 October 2009. It was produced by Simen & Espen at Livingroom Studios in Oslo. Sven Ove Bakke of Dagbladet gave the album four out of six, and described it as "revolving around its already established hits with a combination of self-assured conviction and uneasy duteousness." He concluded that the album was overshadowed by its hit single. The band supported fellow Norwegians a-ha in the UK and Oslo legs of their Foot of the Mountain tour in November 2009, and in 2011 Donkeyboy won a European Border Breakers Award for their international success.

Donkeyboy's second album Silver Moon was released on March 2, 2012, and in 2013 they released the single "Triggerfinger" featuring vocals by Kiesza.

Honours 
2009: Three times Spellemannprisen in the categories this year's Hit song, Newcomer and Musical video, for the album Caught in a Life and the tune/video "Ambitions"

Discography

Albums

Singles

References

External links 

Norwegian pop music groups
Spellemannprisen winners
Musical groups established in 2005
2005 establishments in Norway
Musical groups from Drammen